Hu Jhih-ciang (born November 12, 1997) is a Taiwanese actor. He received double nominations at the 59th Golden Horse Awards, namely Best Supporting Actor and the Best New Performer award, for his performance in the 2022 drama film Coo-Coo 043; and eventually winning the latter. In the same year, Hu was also named Best Actor at the 44th Golden Harvest Awards for his role in the short film Revolting with Dragon.

Filmography

Television series

Film

Music video appearances

Awards and nominations

References

External links 

 
 
 

1997 births
Living people
Taiwanese male television actors
Taiwanese male film actors
21st-century Taiwanese male actors
Taipei National University of the Arts alumni
People from Yunlin County